Richard Franck was a German musician.

Richard Franck may also refer to:

Richard Franck (captain) (1624?–1708)

See also
Richard Frank (disambiguation)